Blades is a village in the parish of Saint Philip in Barbados.
The Blades family (which the island was named after) is a powerful family, partly of which now resides in Ontario, Canada.

Populated places in Barbados
Saint Philip, Barbados